Dance Little Sister may refer to:

 "Dance Little Sister" (Rolling Stones song), 1974
 "Dance Little Sister" (Terence Trent D'Arby song), 1987